Human trafficking is the trade of humans, most commonly for the purpose of forced labour, sexual slavery, or commercial sexual exploitation.

Human Trafficking may also refer to:

 Human Trafficking (miniseries)

See also
, including articles about human trafficking in a number of countries